Megan Finnigan (born 2 April 1998) is an English football midfielder who plays for Everton.

Club career

Everton
Finnigan began her youth career with Everton's academy at the age of nine. She's remained with the club for her development and captained the team in the 2014 FA Woman's Youth Cup final.

Finnigan made her Everton first team debut in 2015 making 6 total appearances that season. She would sign her first professional contract with the Blues in July 2017.

International career
Finnigan has made appearances for England from U17 through to U20 level. Having captained the U-19s during the 2017 European Championships., she was a member of the U20 squad which claimed bronze at the 2018 FIFA U-20 Women's World Cup.

Career statistics

Club

Honours

England U20s
FIFA U-20 Women's World Cup third place: 2018

References

External links

Everton Profile

Living people
English women's footballers
Everton F.C. (women) players
FA Women's National League players
1998 births
Women's association football midfielders
England women's under-21 international footballers